Brasilidia is a genus of proturans in the family Acerentomidae.

Species
 Brasilidia auleta Szeptycki & Bedano, 2003
 Brasilidia nagaroorica Prabhoo, 1977
 Brasilidia sanmartini Tuxen, 1984
 Brasilidia tropica Nosek, 1973

References

Protura